Battle of Satala can refer to:

 Battle of Satala (298), between the Romans under Galerius and the Sassanid Persians under Narseh
 Battle of Satala (530), between the Eastern Romans under Sittas and the Sassanid Persians under Mihr-Mihroe